Olive is an unincorporated community in Olive Township, St. Joseph County, in the U.S. state of Indiana.

History
A post office opened at Olive in 1836, but was soon discontinued, in 1837. The community took its name from Olive Township.

Geography

References

Unincorporated communities in St. Joseph County, Indiana
Unincorporated communities in Indiana